Hanuman is a 2005 Indian animated feature film directed by V. G. Samant and produced by Shailendra Singh at  Percept Picture Company and Silvertoons. The animated film dramatizes the life of its title character, Hanuman, a Hindu Deity. The animation was created by Silvertoons. It is India's first full-length fully animated feature film to be released theatrically (there were several earlier ones made by Pentamedia Graphics). The film popularised animation and kickstarted the growth of India's animation industry.

Plot
This animated movie depicts Hanuman's life from birth. The narrator is actor Mukesh Khanna. The movie relays how Hanuman was born to Anjani (a female Apsara) and Kesari, by the blessings of Vayu-Dev, the Wind God. Hanuman, who is the 11th rudra incarnation of Shiva was blessed with supreme intelligence, strength and divine powers. As a baby, Hanuman was quite naughty and used his powers to pester the saints living in the nearby forest. Once when he was hungry, he leapt to catch the sun thinking it was a fruit.

On the insistence of Vayu, Indra and the other Gods came together to bless Hanuman with immortal life. Hanuman's blessings include: no fear/harm from the Brahmastra, no harm could befall him from weapons, fire or water. He could overcome death and he could transform his body to take the smallest form or attain the biggest form of life. Blessed with divine powers Hanuman grew up to be powerful. He helped Lord Ram and Laxman in their search for Sita. Hanuman burned the golden city Lanka and with his super powers helped Lord Ram and Laxman defeat Ravana and secure the release of Sita. Seeing his devotion and love towards him, Lord Ram blessed Hanuman with the boon of immortality.

Voice cast
Mukesh Khanna as Hanuman
Chiranjeevi in Telugu version 
Viraj Adhav as Ram
Sumit Pathak as Laxman
Mona Shetty as Seeta
Manoj Pandey as Meghnath / Vanararaj Kesari
Rajesh Jolly as Ravana
Sanket Jaiswal as Angada
Shahnawaz Pradhan as Sugreev
Manish Wadhwa as Indra Deva
Anup Shukla as Pavana Deva
Tirthankar Mitra as Maruti

Soundtrack 
Soundtrack was composed by Tapas Relia.
Akadam Bakadam Dekho Yeh Tikadam - Shravan
Hanumaan Chalisa - Vijay Prakash, Rashmi, Nandini Srikar
Jai Hanuman Gyan Gun Sagar - Shankar Mahadevan, Kailash Kher
Jai Bajrangbali - Palash Sen, Kinshuk Sen	
Bridge Across The Ocean - Vijay Prakash
Destroying The Ashok Vatika - Vijay Prakash
Kumbhkaran - Vijay Prakash

Business 
Percept entertained in to a merchandising deal with Kishore Biyani's Future Group, valued at 3.7 crore INR, with merchandise being sold exclusively, pan-India, at Big Bazaar.

Successor
A companion film, Hanuman Returns (later retitled Return of Hanuman), was released on 28 December 2007. The sequel project was helmed by director Anurag Kashyap and produced by Shailendra Singh and Percept Pictures.

A third film called, Return of Ravan, was announced by Shailendra Singh in 2013, but has yet to be completed.

See also
 List of indian animated feature films

References

External links

Info at Yahoo Movies UK

2005 films
2005 animated films
Indian animated films
2000s Hindi-language films
Indian children's films
Hindu mythological films
Animated films based on Ramayana
Films scored by Tapas Relia
Hanuman in popular culture